Lisa Sylvester is an American Peabody and Emmy award-winning journalist and television correspondent. She previously reported on CNN's The Situation Room.   She joined WPXI, Channel 11 in Pittsburgh in October 2013, anchoring the 6 and 11 p.m. and on WPGH's 10 p.m. newscast, which is produced by WPXI.

Career
She earned a bachelor's degree in international economics at Georgetown University and then a master's degree from Northwestern University's Medill School of Journalism. She worked for KTVI-TV in St. Louis, for WMBD-TV in Peoria, Illinois, and for WKRN-TV in Nashville, Tennessee before her start in major network news. She worked for ABC News from 2000 to 2004, and as the Washington-based correspondent for Lou Dobbs Tonight. She then moved to CNN and she served as a Washington, D.C.-based correspondent for The Situation Room.

See also
List of CNN anchors
List of Georgetown University alumni

Endnotes

External links
 

Living people
Year of birth missing (living people)
American television reporters and correspondents
Medill School of Journalism alumni
Georgetown College (Georgetown University) alumni
Place of birth missing (living people)